Jorge Carlos Pellegrini (born 1956 in Santa Fe) is a former Argentine footballer. He played for a number of clubs in Argentina including for Argentinos Juniors in the Copa Libertadores final in 1985.

Pellegrini played for a number of clubs in Argentina before joining Argentinos Juniors, most notably Rosario Central, Vélez Sársfield, Gimnasia y Esgrimade La Plata, Colón de Santa Fe and Club Atlético Independiente.

Pellegrini joined Argentinos in 1984 and participated in the club's golden age, winning back-to-back championships in the Metropolitano 1984 and the Nacional 1985. They went on to win the Copa Libertadores 1985, also claiming the 1985 Copa Interamericana and playing in the Copa Intercontinental against Juventus of Italy.

Titles

References

1956 births
Living people
Footballers from Santa Fe, Argentina
Argentine footballers
Argentina international footballers
Association football defenders
Argentine Primera División players
Rosario Central footballers
Atlético Tucumán footballers
Club Atlético Vélez Sarsfield footballers
Club de Gimnasia y Esgrima La Plata footballers
Club Atlético Colón footballers
Club Atlético Independiente footballers
Instituto footballers
Argentinos Juniors footballers
Place of birth missing (living people)